Copenhagen was the name of a number of steamships, including:

 , a steamship wrecked off Florida in 1900
 , a Great Eastern Railway passenger ferry

Ship names